Caruban Station (station code: CRB) is a second-class railway station in Krajan, Mejayan, Madiun Regency, East Java, Indonesia, operated by Kereta Api Indonesia. This is only Madiun Regency's railway station where provides the passengers service. This railway station's new building is operated—which has four tracks (two main lines and two passing tracks)—since Nganjuk–Babadan double track segment activation on 30 April 2019.

Services

Passenger services

Executive class
 Bangunkarta, destination of  via – and 
 Gajayana Fakultatif, destination of  via  and

Mixed class

Economy class

Gallery

References

External links 

 Kereta Api Indonesia - Indonesian railway company

Madiun Regency
Railway stations in East Java